Mucho Calor (subtitled A Presentation in Latin Jazz) is an album by trumpeter Conte Candoli and alto saxophonist Art Pepper in an octet with tenor saxophonist Bill Perkins, pianist Russ Freeman, bassist Ben Tucker, drummer Chuck Flores and percussionists Jack Costanzo and Mike Pacheko recorded in 1957 and originally released on the Andex label.

Reception

The AllMusic review by Scott Yanow noted: "the music is quite jazz-oriented if a touch lightweight. Worth investigating by fans of the idiom".

Track listing 
 "Mucho Calor" (Bill Holman) - 6:53
 "Autumn Leaves" (Joseph Kosma, Jacques Prévert) - 3:05
 "Mambo de la Pinta" (Art Pepper) - 5:29
 "I'll Remember April" (Gene de Paul, Don Raye) - 2:21
 "Vaya Hombre Vaya" (Holman) - 3:21
 "I Love You" (Cole Porter) - 5:47
 "Mambo Jumbo" (Conte Candoli) - 3:47
 "Old Devil Moon" (Burton Lane, Yip Harburg) - 5:27
 "Pernod" (Johnny Mandel) - 3:57
 "That Old Black Magic" (Harold Arlen, Johnny Mercer) - 4:25

Personnel 
Conte Candoli - trumpet, arranger (track 7)
Art Pepper - alto saxophone, arranger (tracks 3, 4, 
Bill Perkins - tenor saxophone
Russ Freeman - piano
Ben Tucker - bass 
Chuck Flores - drums
Jack Costanzo and Mike Pacheko - bongos, congas
Benny Carter (track 2), Bill Holman (tracks 1, 5, 6, 8 & 10), Johnny Mandel (track 9) - arranger

References 

Art Pepper albums
Conte Candoli albums
1958 albums